The vizier was the senior minister of the Fatimid Caliphate for most of the Egyptian period of its existence. Originally it was held by civilian officials who acted as the chief civilian ministers of the caliphs, analogous to the original model established by the Abbasids. When a vizier was not appointed, an "intermediary" was designated instead. The enfeeblement of the caliph's power and the crisis of the Fatimid regime under Caliph al-Mustansir, however, led to the rise of military strongmen, who dominated the post from the 1070s until the Caliphate's end. These "viziers of the sword" were also commanders-in-chief of the army, effectively sidelined the caliphs and ruled in their stead, often seizing power from their predecessors. The last vizier, Saladin, abolished the Fatimid Caliphate in 1171 (see Saladin in Egypt).

History and powers
During the Ifriqiyan period of the Fatimid Caliphate (909–973), the title of "vizier", although current in the eastern Islamic world, was not used. 
It was adopted after the Fatimid conquest of Egypt, where the office had had a long tradition under the autonomous Tulunid and Ikhshidid dynasties. Although the last Ikhshidid vizier, Ja'far ibn al-Furat, continued to exercise many of his previous functions, the conqueror and viceroy of Egypt, Jawhar, refused to recognize his possession of the vizieral title. Likewise, when Caliph al-Mu'izz li-Din Allah arrived in Egypt, he preferred to avoid delegating his powers to a vizier, although he appointed Ya'qub ibn Killis, a former Ikhshidid official, as head of the administrative apparatus. It was only  that Caliph al-Aziz Billah gave the title of vizier to Ibn Killis, who continued as head of the administration until his death in 991.

After Ibn Killis, the caliphs could choose whether to appoint a vizier, or entrust affairs to an "intermediary" who mediated between the Caliph and his officials and subjects. In line with the Fatimids' general policy of toleration of Christians and Jews, several viziers were Christians or of Christian origin, beginning with Isa ibn Nasturus under al-Aziz. Jews, on the other hand, only appear to have held the office after converting to Islam, Ibn Killis being the most prominent example.

The early viziers served at the pleasure of the caliph who had appointed them, and exemplified what the 11th-century legal theorist al-Mawardi called  ("vizier of execution"), effectively being, in the description of the Orientalist Marius Canard, "agents for the execution of the sovereign's will". Indeed, their careers were often very brief, being deposed, imprisoned, beaten, and frequently executed, by the caliph or by other court rivals. As a result, according to Canard, "broadly speaking, the main characteristic of the vizierate of the Fatimids is the insecurity of the viziers", with periods where the office changed hands in rapid succession. Under the weak al-Mustansir, five viziers held office between 1060–1062 alone.

This changed with the rise of the military strongmen to the position: Badr al-Jamali and his successors held full powers in the caliph's stead, and represented al-Mawardi's , the "vizier with delegated powers". Due to the military background of the holders of the vizierate, they were also known as "viziers of the sword and pen" (wazīr al-sayf wa'l-qalam), or simply "viziers of the sword". The "viziers of the sword", who dominated the last century of the Caliphate's existence, were at the same time chief ministers in charge of all civil administration, heads of the armies, responsible for all judicial matters as chief , and even for all religious matters as head missionary. As the viziers' power grew to eclipse the caliphs', they even assumed the title of "king" followed by an epithet.

Described as a "second vizierate", the office served as a springboard for the actual vizierate for Abu'l-Fath Yanis, Ridwan ibn Walakhshi and Dirgham.

Residences
Ibn Killis established his official residence in the southeastern part of Cairo, close to the Sa'ada Gate, a quarter which became known as  after Ibn Killis. The building was not only the residence of the vizier, but also the seat of the fiscal bureaus, and housed storage rooms for garments, the treasury, books, and drinks. Each of the latter was supervised by a comptroller, and the  itself also had its own superintendent. The  was an echo of the caliphal palaces, and included a small mosque for prayer and kitchens for the banquets organized by the vizier. According to the 15th-century historian al-Maqrizi, after Ibn Killis' death, his residence was not occupied again by a vizier until Abu Muhammad al-Yazuri in 1050. It was then that it became a true , being the official residence of the subsequent holders of the office until Badr al-Jamali.

This edifice then passed into the hands of his son and successor al-Afdal Shahanshah, and then to another of Badr's sons, al-Muzaffar Ja'far; from him it was later known . Later converted to a guest-house, it was here that the deposed Fatimids were held by Saladin after the overthrow of the dynasty in 1171. Al-Afdal also built a new, and much larger and more luxurious , on the northeastern part of the city, near the Bab al-Nasr. This was the final residence of the Fatimid viziers until the end of the dynasty.

List of viziers

Notes

References

Sources

 
 
 
 
 
 
 
 

 
 
 

Government of the Fatimid Caliphate
979 establishments
1171 disestablishments
Heads of government
Titles in Egypt